Kambel Mohammad Azim (also Romanized as Kambel Moḩammad ʿAz̧īm) is a village in Kambel-e Soleyman Rural District, in the Central District of Chabahar County, Sistan and Baluchestan Province, Iran. At the 2006 census, its population was 245, in 45 families.

References 

Populated places in Chabahar County